Nasiruddin was originally a honorific title and is a masculine given name and surname of Arabic origin. There are many variant spellings in English due to transliteration including Nasir al-Din, and Nasruddin. Notable people with the title or name include:

People with the given name Nasiruddin 
 Nasiruddin Sailani Badesha (died 1507), Sufi saint
 Nasiruddin Chowdhury (born 1985), Bangladeshi footballer
 Nasiruddin Chiragh Dehlavi (1274–1356), mystic-poet and Sufi saint
 Nasiruddin Faruque (born 1983), Bangladeshi cricketer
 Nasiruddin Mahmud Shah of Bengal (died 1459), sultan of Bengal
 Nasiruddin Mahmud (eldest son of Iltutmish) (died 1229), ruler of Bengal
 Nasiruddin Mahmud Shah, Sultan of Delhi (1246–1266), Muslim Turkic ruler
 Nasiruddin Nasrat Shah (died 1532), sultan of Bengal
 Nasiruddin Nasir (born 1992), Malaysian actor
 Nasiruddin Ahmed Pintu (1967–2015), Bangladeshi politician
 Nasiruddin Khan (c. 1948 – 2018), an Indian politician from West Bengal
 Nasiruddin Bughra Khan, governor and then Sultan of Bengal (1281–1291)
 Nasiruddin Yousuff (fl. from 1973), Bangladeshi stage and film director

People with the middle name or father's name 
 Ismail Nasiruddin of Terengganu (1907–1979), Yang di-Pertuan Agong of Malaysia
 Muhammad Nasiruddin al-Albani (1914–1999), Syrian-Albanian Islamic scholar

People with the surname Nasiruddin 
 Advocate Nasiruddin (1892–1949), lawyer and political and social leader from Bhopal, India
 Mir Mohammad Nasiruddin (fl. from 1990s), Bangladeshi politician
 Mohammad Nasiruddin (1888–1994), Bangladeshi journalist
 Shaikh Nasiruddin (1916-1991), an Indian cricketer
 Syed Nasiruddin, a Sufi saint and military leader associated with the spread of Islam in Bengal in the 14th century

See also 
 ad-Din, Arabic name suffix
 Nimatnama-i-Nasiruddin-Shahi, 16th-century medieval Indian cookbook, written in Persian language
 Nasir al-Din (disambiguation)

Arabic masculine given names
Arabic-language surnames